This list is of the Historic Sites of Japan located within the Prefecture of Okinawa. Much of the heritage of the Ryūkyū Kingdom and Islands was destroyed during the Battle of Okinawa. The mausoleum complex of Tamaudun, Shuri Castle, Katsuren Castle, Nakagusuku Castle, Nakijin Castle, Zakimi Castle, Sefa-utaki, and Sonohyan-utaki all form part of the UNESCO World Heritage Site Gusuku Sites and Related Properties of the Kingdom of Ryukyu.

National Historic Sites
As of 1 December 2020, forty-three Sites have been designated as being of national significance.

Prefectural Historic Sites
As of 1 May 2020, fifty-four Sites have been designated as being of prefectural importance.

Municipal Historic Sites
As of 1 May 2020, a further three hundred and six Sites have been designated as being of municipal importance, including:

Registered Historic Sites
As of 1 December 2020, two Monuments have been registered (as opposed to designated) as Historic Sites at a national level.

See also

 Cultural Properties of Japan
 Ryūkyū Kingdom
 List of Important Cultural Properties of Japan (Okinawa: structures)
 List of Places of Scenic Beauty of Japan (Okinawa)
 List of Cultural Properties of Japan - paintings (Okinawa)
 Okinawa Prefectural Museum
 Hague Convention for the Protection of Cultural Property in the Event of Armed Conflict

References

External links
  Cultural Properties in Okinawa Prefecture
  List of Cultural Properties in Okinawa Prefecture
 Comprehensive Database of Archaeological Site Reports in Japan (Nara National Research Institute for Cultural Properties)

Okinawa Prefecture
 Okinawa